t Kapoentje (literally: "The Little Rascal") was a youth supplement published by the Flemish newspaper Het Volk from April 3, 1947 until 1989. It was notable for its comics and, together with Ons Volkske, the most important comic book magazine in Flanders.

History
t Kapoentje was created when the newspapers De Gids and De Standaard contested one another over copyright issues. The titles of the magazines Ons Volk Ontwaakt and Ons Volkske which were published by the newspaper De Nieuwe Standaard (n.v. De Gids) were claimed back by De Standaard in 1947. As a result, Ons Volk Ontwaakt was discontinued and changed to a new name, Overal, while the series which appeared in Ons Volkske were republished in t Kapoentje. From October 11, 1951 on t Kapoentje became a free supplement of Het Volk.

t Kapoentje published many comics by Marc Sleen, Willy Vandersteen, Bob De Moor, Eugeen Hermans (aka "Pink"), Rik Clément, Buth, Jef Nys, Karel Boumans, Marcel Steurbaut and the Dutch series Dokie Durf by Piet van Elk. In later years Hurey, Karel Boumans, Marcel Steurbaut, Arle (pseudonym of Berck and Leo Loedts), Frank Sels, Gilbert Declercq, Jeff Broeckx, Albert van Beek, Henk Kabos, Henk Sprenger, Piet Wijn, Ton Beek, Gerrit Stapel, Dick Vlottes, Raymond Bär van Hemmersweil, Jan van Reek, Peter de Smet also had their comics published. During its heyday Sleen's Piet Fluwijn en Bolleke and Vandersteen's De Vrolijke Bengels were the most popular comics. In 1947 Vandersteen left to join De Standaard. Bob De Moor continued De Vrolijke Bengels until 1950, when Sleen took over the series and renamed it De Lustige Kapoentjes, who quickly became the magazine's mascots.

Sleen, Rik Clément and Michel Casteels were the magazine's editors for many years. In 1965 Sleen quit and joined De Standaard. Like many comic book magazines the sales of t Kapoentje went downhill during the 1970s and by 1989 the magazine was disestablished.

References

1947 comics debuts
1989 comics endings
1947 establishments in Belgium
1989 disestablishments in Belgium
Comics magazines published in Belgium
Children's magazines published in Belgium
Weekly magazines published in Belgium
Defunct magazines published in Belgium
Dutch-language magazines
Magazines published in Flanders
Magazines established in 1947
Magazines disestablished in 1989
Newspaper supplements
Youth magazines